Amata paradelpha  is a species of moth of the family Erebidae first described by Alfred Jefferis Turner in 1905. It is found in Australia.

References 

paradelpha
Moths described in 1905
Moths of Australia